"Obsesión" is a song by Dominican-American bachata band Aventura with Judy Santos as the female vocalist. It was included on their second studio album, We Broke the Rules (2002), and an English-language version was made for the same album. The song achieved success in many countries, topping many international charts. In France, the song held the French Singles Chart's number-one slot for seven weeks, and as of August 2014, it was the 19th-best-selling single of the 21st century in France, with 565,000 units sold. A radio remix of the song was added to the 2004 special edition version of Love & Hate, which was exclusively released in Italy.

In 2004, the song was covered by 3rd Wish featuring Baby Bash and production from Mintman. This version was less successful than the original version but still reached number seven in Switzerland, number five in Germany, number two in Austria and number 12 in France. Later, in 2005, Mexican-American singer Frankie J made an English and more soul-styled version of the song, also featuring Baby Bash, called "Obsession (No Es Amor)". This version was successful in the United States, Australia, and New Zealand, reaching the top five in all three countries.

Content
The lyrics were written by Romeo Santos, and the refrain is performed by the female vocalist Judy Santos (no relation). The song's lyrics explain a man's liking of a woman to the point of obsession. However, this feeling is "not love", and is still only and just an obsession.

Track listings
CD single
 "Obsesión" – 4:12
 "Cuando Volverás" – 3:30
	
CD maxi
 "Obsesión" (radio mix) – 3:49
 "Obsesión" (dance remix) – 5:39
 "Obsesión" (dance radio edit) – 3:52
 "Obsesión" (English remix) – 4:10
 "Todavía Me Amas" – 4:43

Charts

Weekly charts

Year-end charts

Decade-end charts

Certifications

Release history

Frankie J version

In 2005, Mexican-American singer Frankie J covered the song under the title "Obsession (No Es Amor)", featuring Baby Bash. Released as a single on January 10, 2005, the cover peaked at number three on the US Billboard Hot 100, number five in Australia and number four in New Zealand. The song was produced by Australian-born UK-based producer Stewart Magee. Model Vida Guerra made a cameo in the video as Frankie J's love interest and object of his obsession.

Track listing
 "Obsession (No Es Amor)" (album version)
 "Obsession (No Es Amor)" (Not Gangster version)
 "Obsession (No Es Amor)" (Sic Element radio mix)
 "Obsession (Luny Tunes Remix)" featuring Mr. Phillips 
 "Obsession (Luny Tunes Remix)" featuring Mr. Phillips

Charts

Weekly charts

Year-end charts

Certifications

Release history

Tropical Family version

French collective musical project for cover songs of summer, Tropical Family included the song as track number 3. The single is credited as "Obsesión (Tropical Family)" but is interpreted by Kenza Farah and Lucenzo. The single is bilingual in Spanish and French with added French lyrics. The Spanish parts are sung by Lucenzo and the French by Farah. The single entered the SNEP French Singles Chart the same week at number 23.

Charts

References

 

2002 songs
2003 singles
2004 singles
2005 singles
Aventura (band) songs
Baby Bash songs
European Hot 100 Singles number-one singles
Frankie J songs
Number-one singles in Austria
Number-one singles in Germany
Number-one singles in Italy
Number-one singles in Switzerland
SNEP Top Singles number-one singles
Songs written by Romeo Santos
Song recordings produced by Luny Tunes
Tropical Family songs
Ultratop 50 Singles (Flanders) number-one singles